Friendly Beaches Reserve is a 140 ha coastal nature reserve in eastern Tasmania, Australia, 190 km north-east of Hobart and 180 km south-east of Launceston.  It is located on the north-east side of the Freycinet Peninsula, bordering the Freycinet National Park.  It is owned and managed by Bush Heritage Australia (BHA), by which it was purchased in 1997.

Natural values
The reserve contains coastal heath, woodland and a saltwater lagoon.  It protects one of the few remaining natural beach systems on Tasmania's east coast.  The Tasmanian devil has been recorded from the reserve.

Access
While visitors are welcome to walk along the beach bordering the reserve, access to the reserve itself is prohibited due to the threat of contamination by the soil pathogen Cinnamon Fungus.

References

External links
 Bush Heritage Australia

Bush Heritage Australia reserves
Nature reserves in Tasmania
East Coast Tasmania
Beaches of Tasmania
1997 establishments in Australia